The Queen of SOP (Chinese: 胜女的代价) is a 2012 Chinese-Taiwanese television series produced by GTV and directed by Zhang Boyu. It stars Joe Chen, Hans Zhang and Godfrey Gao. The show first premiered on Hunan TV on 14 October 2012 before airing on FTV. The series was the highest rated drama in its time slot for the year, and also received positive reviews from the audience.

Synopsis
Lin Xiao Jie (Joe Chen) is a low rung employee at a large Taiwanese departmental store. Dreaming of furthering her studies in England so that she can rise up the ranks in her company, Xiao Jie jumps at the opportunity to be an assistant at a company photo shoot in London. On her final day there, she gets mugged and flags down Tang Jun (Hans Zhang) for help, who successfully catches the thief and returns her belongings.

After flying back to Taiwan, Xiao Jie decides to take a leap of faith and study abroad. She sees an apartment listing online that she immediately takes a liking to, and messages the owner, 'Tom', who happens to be Tang Jun. 'Tom' agrees to rent the apartment out to her, and makes preparations for her arrival. Xiao Jie and 'Tom' begin an online friendship, with Xiao Jie seeking Tom's advice. Eventually, Tang Jun begins to fall for Xiao Jie.

However, before Xiao Jie makes her final plans to leave, she is offered a better position at the company by the CEO, and decides not to leave for London. Tang Jun, upon hearing the news, is disappointed. Shortly after, Tang Jun is arm-twisted to go to Taiwan by his mother, who wants his help in a business deal. Although he is reluctant, Tang Jun agrees, but becomes enthusiastic when he realizes that Xiao Jie works for the company his mother is engaging in a deal with. However, upon arriving in Taiwan, Tang Jun finds out that Xiao Jie has started a relationship with the son of her company's CEO, Gao Zi Qi (Godfrey Gao), after he expressed interest in her at a press conference.

Xiao Jie and Zi Qi gets engaged eventually, but the day before the wedding, Zi Qi's ex-girlfriend and supermodel Bai Ji Qing (Coco Jiang) shows up and reveals that she is the one Zi Qi really loves. The heartbroken Xiao Jie leaves and decides to focus on her career. Under the support and encouragement of 'Tom', Xiao Jie becomes a successful businesswoman. Unbeknownst to her, Tang Jun is really her online friend 'Tom' and the heir to a supermarket chain. Not wishing to give up on a chance at love with Xiao Jie, he hides his identity to pursue her. But the road to this is paved with misunderstandings and missed chances.

Cast

Main

Supporting

Special appearance

Soundtrack

International broadcast

References

External links
GTV The Queen of SOP official website

Formosa Television original programming
Gala Television original programming
2012 Chinese television series debuts
2012 Taiwanese television series debuts
Hunan Television dramas
Chinese romantic comedy television series
Television series by H&R Century Pictures
Television series by Croton Media